Loretta Chase, née Loretta Lynda Chekani (born 1949) is an American writer of romance novels since 1987.

Biography
Loretta Lynda Chekani was born in 1949 in a family of Albanian origin. She studied at New England public schools before receiving a bachelor's degree from Clark University, where she majored in English. Her past lives include clerical, administrative, and part-time teaching at Clark and a "Dickensian six-month experience" as a meter maid. After college, her first professional writing job was for an exhibition catalog. This led to a job moonlighting as a corporate video scriptwriter. During this time she met a video producer who enticed her to write novels...and eventually to marry him. Her first Regency manuscript, Isabella, was bought by the first New York editor who read it and led to a successful career as a romance author. Chase said of her marriage: "The books resulting from this union have won a surprising number of awards, including the Romance Writers of America RITA® Award." Her books have also won several Romantic Times Reviewers' Choice awards, various RRA-L (Romance Readers Anonymous) awards, and the All About Romance Top 100 Romances award multiple times.

Bibliography

Trevelyan Family Saga Series
Isabella 1987/Nov
The English Witch 1988/Jul

Regency Series
Viscount Vagabond 1989/Jan
The Devil's Delilah 1989/Jun

Scoundrels Series
The Lion's Daughter 1992/Oct
Captives of the Night 1994/Mar
Lord of Scoundrels 1995/Jan
"The Mad Earl's Bride" in Three Weddings and a Kiss 1995/Sep (with Catherine Anderson, Lisa Kleypas and Kathleen E. Woodiwiss)
The Last Hellion 1998/Apr

Carsington Brothers Series
Miss Wonderful 2004/Mar
Mr. Impossible 2005/Mar
Lord Perfect 2006/Mar
Not Quite a Lady 2007/May
Last Night's Scandal 2010/Aug

Fallen Women Series
Not Quite a Lady 2007/May
Your Scandalous Ways 2008/Jun
Don't Tempt Me 2009/Jul

Single Novels
Knave's Wager 1990/Jun
The Sandalwood Princess 1990/Dec

Omnibus
Isabella and the English Witch, 2003
Viscount Vagabond and Devil's Delilah, 2004
The Sandalwood Princess / Knave's Wager, 2004

Dressmakers Series 
Silk is for Seduction , 2011/July
Scandal Wears Satin , 2012/June
Vixen in Velvet , 2014/June
Dukes Prefer Blonds , 2015/December

Difficult Dukes Series
A Duke in Shining Armour  2017
Ten Things I Hate About The Duke  2020

Anthologies (Other)
"Falling Stars" in A Christmas Collection 1992 (with Stella Cameron, Joan Hohl and Linda Lael Miller)
"Falling Stars" in A Christmas Present 1994 (with Judith E. French and Lisa Kleypas)
"The Mad Earl's Bride" in Three Times a Bride 2010/May (with Catherine Anderson and Samantha James)
"Lord Lovedon's Duel" in Royal Bridesmaids 2012/July (with Stephanie Laurens and Gaelen Foley)

References 

4. ^Loretta Chase, "Die wilde Braut des Duke", Regency Romance, Verlag dp DIGITAL PUBLISHERS

External links
Official website

1949 births
RITA Award winners
Living people
American romantic fiction writers
Women romantic fiction writers
Writers of historical romances